Light ball may refer to:
Ball lightning
Flare